There are 32 districts in the state of Chhattisgarh, which has a total population 25,540,196 as of 2011. Mainly Chhattisgarh(CG) state has large population in cities like Raipur, Raigarh, Bhilai, Korba,  Ambikapur, Jagdalpur and Bilaspur. Male and Female population in this state is 12,827,915 and 12,712,281 respectively (as in 2011).

Urban Agglomeration Constituents
Urban Agglomerations constituents with a population above 100,000 as per 2011 census are shown in the table below.

Nagar Panchayats
The list of nagar panchayats and their population(as in 2011) are shown below:

References

Cities
Chhattisgarh